Bhabani Shankar Bhoi is an Indian politician. He was elected to the Odisha Legislative Assembly from Talsara (ST) in the 2019 Odisha Legislative Assembly election as a member of the Bharatiya Janata Party.

References

1981 births
Living people
People from Sundergarh district
Bharatiya Janata Party politicians from Odisha
Odisha MLAs 2019–2024